is a Japanese real estate company.  It is listed on the Nikkei 225. Founded in 1896, Tokyo Tatemono has its headquarters in Yaesu, Chūō, Tokyo, and its current president is Hajime Sakuma. It develops, sells, and manages commercial buildings and facilities, condominia, and houses. The company is also involved in the development and management of hotels, leisure centers, vacation facilities, golf courses, resort places, and restaurants, as wells as well as renovating buildings and condominia. It has expanded its investments into China and the United States, and is considering about expansion into Southeast Asia. The company estimates that the company may reach an operating profit of 10 billion yen by fiscal 2014.

References

Real estate companies based in Tokyo
Service companies based in Tokyo
Construction and civil engineering companies based in Tokyo
Construction and civil engineering companies established in 1896
Japanese companies established in 1896